Gerald Achee (November 15, 1952 - January 12, 2021) known by his stage name Gerry Drums, was a Trinidadian drummer and the leader of the Village Drums of Freedom.

Biography 
Gerald Achee was born in St. James, a suburb of Trinidad and Tobago's capital Port of Spain. He was introduced to the traditional Afro-Caribbean music at an early age. Achee started his artistic career as a limbo-dancer. Later he began to play djembe. In 1969 Gerald Achee founded the free improvisation percussion band Village Drums of Freedom. From 1970 until 1980 he travelled with his ensemble and a group of dancers through Europe, South America and US and then finally settled in Brooklyn, NY. His band grew bigger and now consists of more than a hundred drummers all over the world. Every year Village Drums of Freedom plays a leading part in the Trinidad and Tobago Carnival. In 2003 Gerald Achee and VDOF released an album Historic Travel: cultural rhythms. In 2009 he recorded an album Three Neighbours with Perry Robinson and Joel Chassan. And in the same year – Night Train For Lovers And Thieves with the Gypsy Groovz Orchestra, which was nominated to the Best Album of 2009 in World music on BBC. Gerald Achee was a member of the Rastafari movement.

Style 

Gerald Achee (Stage name Gerry Drums) was a Calypso musician and djembe drummer. In his music, Achee develops traditions of Count Ossie, Andre Tanker and Babatunde Olatunji. His works with clarinetist Perry Robinson and other jazz musicians characterised him as a free jazz, avant-garde djembe drummer.

Discography 
 2003: Historic Travel: cultural rhythms (Village Drums of Freedom)
 2009: Three Neighbours (Gerald Achee, Perry Robinson and Joel Chassan)
 2009: Night Train For Lovers And Thieves (Gerald Achee and Gypsy Groovz Orchestra)

See also 
Polyrhythm
Master drummer

References

External links
 Gerald Achee and Village Drums of Freedom official Soundcloud account

1952 births
2021 deaths
Avant-garde jazz drummers
Calypsonians
Djembe players
Free jazz drummers
Master drummers
Performers of Rastafarian music
Trinidad and Tobago drummers
Male drummers
Free improvising musicians
Male jazz musicians